Sergiu Florin Buș (born 2 November 1992) is a Romanian professional footballer who plays as a forward for Liga I club Chindia Târgoviște, on loan from CFR Cluj.

Buș started out his career at CFR Cluj, and apart from his time with various teams in Romania has represented sides in Bulgaria, England, Italy and South Korea.

Club career
Born in Cluj-Napoca, Buș began his senior career at CFR Cluj, where he totalled three goals from 19 Liga I appearances between 2009 and 2014. Whilst under contract with CFR, he was loaned out to Unirea Alba Iulia, Târgu Mureș, Gaz Metan Mediaș and Corona Brașov, respectively, before joining Bulgarian side CSKA Sofia on 7 July 2014. Buș scored his first goal for "the Reds" 20 days later, in an Eternal derby 2–0 win over Levski Sofia. He repeated the feat on 25 October that year, netting the second in a 3–0 win.

On 2 February 2015, Buș was signed by English club Sheffield Wednesday for an undisclosed fee. He registered his debut in the Football League Championship five days later, being brought on as a 63rd-minute substitute and obtaining the penalty converted by Will Keane for a 1–1 home draw with Cardiff City. He scored his only goal for Wednesday in a 1–1 draw with Huddersfield Town, on 4 April 2015. On 2 February 2016, Buș moved to Italian side Salernitana on loan for the remainder of the Serie B season. 

At the start of 2017, he returned to Romania and signed for Astra Giurgiu, for which he started in the Cupa României final 3–5 loss on penalties to FC Voluntari on 27 May. The following month, Levski Sofia confirmed the signing of Buș as a free agent. He played his second successive national cup final on 9 May 2018, as Levski lost 2–4 on penalties to Slavia Sofia. Buș was re-signed by Gaz Metan Mediaș for the 2019–20 Liga I season, and managed to score ten goals from 30 games in the competition, which inspired a move to FCSB.

Buș did not adapt in Bucharest and was sold for a rumoured €450,000 to K League 1 team Seongnam, on 21 January 2021. On 13 December 2021, after less than a year in South Korea, it was announced that Buș rejoined his boyhood club CFR Cluj.

International career
Buș was capped for the Romania national team at under-17, under-19 and under-21 levels. He was called up for the first time to the seniors for the UEFA Nations League group matches against Northern Ireland and Austria in September 2020, but did not make his debut.

Personal life
Buș's elder brother, Laurențiu, is also a professional footballer. The latter represented CFR Cluj's rivals from Universitatea Cluj at both junior and senior levels.

Career statistics

Club

Honours
CFR Cluj
Liga I: 2009–10, 2021–22
Cupa României: 2009–10; runner-up: 2012–13
Supercupa României: 2010

Astra Giurgiu
Cupa României runner-up: 2016–17

Levski Sofia
Bulgarian Cup runner-up: 2017–18

References

External links

1992 births
Living people
Sportspeople from Cluj-Napoca
Romanian footballers
Association football forwards
Liga I players
Liga II players
CFR Cluj players
CSM Unirea Alba Iulia players
ASA 2013 Târgu Mureș players
CS Gaz Metan Mediaș players
CSM Corona Brașov footballers
First Professional Football League (Bulgaria) players
PFC CSKA Sofia players
English Football League players
Sheffield Wednesday F.C. players
Serie B players
U.S. Salernitana 1919 players
FC Astra Giurgiu players
PFC Levski Sofia players
FC Steaua București players
AFC Chindia Târgoviște players
K League 1 players
Seongnam FC players
Romania under-21 international footballers
Romanian expatriate footballers
Expatriate footballers in Bulgaria
Romanian expatriate sportspeople in Bulgaria
Expatriate footballers in England
Romanian expatriate sportspeople in England
Expatriate footballers in Italy
Romanian expatriate sportspeople in Italy
Expatriate footballers in South Korea
Romanian expatriate sportspeople in South Korea